Chorizema cordatum, known as the heart-leaf flame pea or Australian flame pea, is a flowering plant of the pea family, endemic to gravelly or loamy soils in eucalyptus forests, in the moist south western parts of Western Australia. The Noongar peoples know the plant as kaly.

Description
It is a bushy evergreen shrub. The attractive and noticeable flowers appear in late winter or spring in long racemes, starting either at the end of stems or from the leaf axils. Flowers are orange and red, 10 to 12 mm in diameter. The heart shaped (or narrower) leaves are 3 to 5 cm long with somewhat wavy edges.

Cultivation
It can be grown as a garden plant, and does well in other parts of the country, (such as Sydney on the other side of the Australian continent). However, a summer with lower humidity is better suited for this plant. As it does not tolerate freezing, in cooler areas it requires the protection of glass. Propagation from seed is easily achieved, and cuttings strike well.

This plant has gained the Royal Horticultural Society's Award of Garden Merit.

References

Mirbelioids
Fabales of Australia
Flora of Western Australia
Garden plants of Australia